Sergey Psakhie (2 March 1952 – 22 December 2018) was a Russian physicist, Chairman of the Presidium of the Tomsk Scientific Center of the Siberian Division of the Russian Academy of Sciences. He was the author and co-author of more than two hundred scientific papers, including five monographs.

Curriculum vitae
 1991 — Professor at Tomsk State University
 1994–1995 — Visiting professor at North Carolina State University. Member of New York Academy of Sciences
 2002 — Director of Institute of Strength Physics and Materials Science SD RAS
 2006 — Professor of Tomsk Polytechnic University, Head of Department

Scientific achievements
 Development of methods of discrete mechanics and their application to solving problems of computer design of new materials (Movable cellular automaton method, cellular automaton method, molecular dynamics method)
 Investigation of the laws of fracture of brittle materials
 Regularities in the formation of dynamic defects and their role in the process of deformation and fracture of heterogeneous materials and structures
 The study of nonlinear effects in solids under high-impact
 Study, study laws governing the behavior of geological media under dynamic effects

Research Interests S.G. Psakhie were multifaceted and covered problems of an unusually wide range. Being an outstanding material scientist he significantly contributed to development the methods of discrete mechanics and tribology, to study the laws of the processes of deformation and destruction of heterogeneous materials and nanostructures. Well-known practically important results of the work of Sergey Psakhie on obtaining special materials for space applications, on friction welding and on the study of the behavior of geological media under dynamic effects.
He is the author of a new method of computer modeling, which is widely used to solve fundamental and practically important problems of materials interaction. In the last decade, the scientific interests of Sergey Psakhie were related to the study of the interactions between hard matter and soft matter in multiphase contrasting materials, the study of the characteristics and anomalies of the behavior of a substance in a confined matter, research of dusty plasma.

S.G. Psakhie made a great contribution to the introduction of network forms of research and development in Russia. He has implemented the network format of the organization of science - integrated research plans (IRP), which allows to effectively integrate the competencies and resources of institutes, universities and companies to solve problems in areas defined by the priorities of the country's scientific and technological development. The interdepartmental project office “Perspective materials, technologies and structures” of the Federal Agency for Scientific Organizations of Russia and the State Corporation for Space Activities “Roscosmos”, the basic organizations of which are the ISPMS SB RAS and Rocket and Space Corporation Energi, was created as a pilot interdepartmental project within the framework of the Integrated Plan for Basic Research materials with a multi-level hierarchical structure for new technologies and robust structures.

Personal life
Psakhie was married, having two daughters and one son. The eldest daughter Olga is a biochemist, living in California. The second daughter, Natalia, is a programmer and lives in California. The only son, Ivan, is a biochemist and works in Germany. In addition, he has four grandchildren, Sonja Vasiljeva, Pavel Vasiljev, Christine Chadnova, and Victoria Chadnova, who all reside in California. Psakhie died on 22 December 2018, aged 66.

Bibliography
Goldin S.V., Psakhie S.G., Dmitriev A.I., Yushin V.I. (2001 ) Structure rearrangement and «lifting» force phenomenon in granular soil under dynamic loading. PHYSICAL MESOMECHANICS, v.4, No3, pp. 97–103(rus)
[2] Ostermeyer, G.-P., Popov, V.L., Shilko, E., Vasiljeva, O. (Eds.) (2021) Multiscale Biomechanics and Tribology of Inorganic and Organic Systems. In memory of Professor Sergey Psakhie, Springer., doi: 10.1007/978-3-030-60124-9

See also
 Institute of Strength Physics and Materials Science SD RAS
 Movable cellular automaton

References

External links
 ISPMS director
 ISPMS sovet
 Sergey Psakhie in ISPMS SB RAS

1952 births
2018 deaths
Russian Jews
People from Tomsk
Tomsk State University alumni
Academic staff of Tomsk State University
Academic staff of Tomsk Polytechnic University